The 517th Airlift Squadron is an active unit of the United States Air Force, Pacific Air Forces 3d Wing at Joint Base Elmendorf–Richardson, Alaska.  It operates Beechcraft C-12 Huron and Boeing C-17 Globemaster III aircraft providing airlift in the Pacific theater.

Mission
The 517th Airlift Squadron provides airlift operating Boeing C-17 Globemaster III and Beechcraft C-12F Huron aircraft.  Supporting worldwide airlift, airdrop, airland requirements while providing airlift for theater deployed forces and resupply of remote Alaskan long-range radar sites in support of United States Pacific Command, North American Aerospace Defense Command, and United States Transportation Command.  Provides aircrew qualification training for the U.S. Air Force.

History

World War II
Activated in December 1940 as the 17th Transport Squadron flying Douglas C-47 Skytrain transport aircraft.  It trained under I Troop Carrier Command for combat operations.   In July 1942, redesignated 17th Troop Carrier Squadron.  It was assigned to VIII Air Support Command of Eighth Air Force and deployed to England in August 1942, providing transport to the newly established U.S. Army Air Forces.

The squadron was transferred to Algiers, Algeria in November 1942, and attached, being later assigned to Twelfth Air Force as part of the North African Campaign. The squadron's aircraft flew supplies to front-line units in Algeria and Tunisia as soon as suitable landing strips were available and evacuated casualties back to rear area field hospitals.    A flight of the squadron deployed to Tenth Air Force in India during the fall of 1942, to assist in the resupply of Brigadier General Frank Merrill and his men, affectionately known as "Merrill's Marauders". It was during this Ceylon, Burma, India campaign that the squadron received its first Distinguished Unit Citation, returning to Tunisia by the end of the year. During WW II, members of a C-47 crew of the 17th Troop Carrier Squadron were credited with downing an enemy plane after they were attacked by Japanese fighter planes while on a mission near the Indo-Burmese border.

The squadron moved to Sicily, dropping airborne forces onto the island during Operation Husky, then moved to forward airfields in Italy during 1943 as part of the Italian Campaign.  Just prior to D Day, part of the 16th left India for Italy to tow gliders into France on D Day.

In July 1944, the detached unit was joined by the remainder of the 16th at Ciampino Airport, Italy and as the European Theater closed in on Germany, part of the 16th again went on detached service to Rosignano Airfield, Italy, operating resupply missions to Greek partisans during September and October 1944.

In the fall of 1944, it moved to France in support of Operation Anvil, the Allied invasion of Southern France, and supported ground forces moving north through the Rhone Valley to link up with Allied forces moving east from Normandy.   Returned to Northern Italy in early 1945, supporting the drive into the Po River Valley and the end of combat in Italy during May 1945.   The squadron also hauled food, clothing, medicine, gasoline, ordnance equipment, and other supplies to the front lines and evacuated patients to rear zone hospitals.

In late May 1945, after V-E Day, the squadron moved to Waller Field, Trinidad and was attached to Air Transport Command.   From Trinidad, the squadron ferried returning military personnel to Morrison Field, Florida, where they were sent on to other bases or prepared for separation after the war.   The squadron was inactivated at the end of July 1945.

Airlift operations

It was activated but unmanned from 1947–1948.  When reactivated again in the 1960 it resupplied Distant Early Warning Line sites in Northern Canada and radar sites in Greenland.  Parts of the squadron deployed to South Vietnam from 1967-1968 to provide tactical airlift.  It provided intratheater airlift within Alaska including support to forward operating bases, airland/airdrop of troops, equipment and supplies, and Search and rescue as required.  It provided Lockheed C-130 Hercules crews for Pacific airlift to the Middle East for Operation Desert Shield, from August to November 1990.

Redesignated the 517th Airlift Squadron on 1 Apr 1992, it has provided worldwide combat airdrop, tactical air/land, operational support airlift, airlift for theater deployed forces and resupply of remote Alaskan long-range radar sites in support of Pacific Air Forces.  It has provided continuous rotational airlift and airdrop support in Afghanistan and Iraq since 2004.  The 517th, flying C-130H1s, was among first United States units to participate in relief efforts following the 2004 Asian tsunami that occurred on 26 December 2004.

Lineage
 Constituted as the 17th Transport Squadron on 20 November 1940
 Activated on 11 December 1940
 Redesignated 17th Troop Carrier Squadron on 4 July 1942
 Inactivated on 31 July 1945
 Activated on 19 May 1947
 Inactivated on 10 September 1948
 Redesignated 17th Troop Carrier Squadron, Medium on 3 July 1952
 Activated on 14 July 1952
 Inactivated on 21 July 1954
 Activated on 24 October 1960 (not organized)
 Organized on 8 February 1961
 Redesignated 17th Troop Carrier Squadron on 8 December 1965
 Redesignated 17th Tactical Airlift Squadron on 1 September 1967
 Redesignated 517th Airlift Squadron on 1 April 1992

Assignments
 64th Transport Group (later 64th Troop Carrier Group), 11 December 1940 – 31 July 1945
 64th Troop Carrier Group, 19 May 1947 – 10 September 1948
 64th Troop Carrier Group, 14 July 1952 – 21 July 1954
 Tactical Air Command, 24 October 1960 (not organized)
 64th Troop Carrier Wing, 8 February 1961
 516th Troop Carrier Wing, 1 January 1963
 5040th Air Base Wing, 15 June 1964
 21st Composite Wing, 8 July 1966
 Twenty-Second Air Force, 31 March 1975
 616th Military Airlift Group, 1 November 1975
 3d Operations Group, 1 April 1992 – present

Stations

 McClellan Field, California, 11 December 1940
 Portland Army Air Base, Oregon, 9 July 1941
 Westover Field, Massachusetts, 12 June–31 July 1942
 RAF Ramsbury (AAF-469), England, 18 August–November 1942
 Operated from Maison Blanche Airport, Algiers, Algeria, 11 November–December 1942
 Blida Airfield, Algeria, c. 12 December 1942
 Kairouan Airfield, Tunisia, 28 June 1943
 El Djem Airfield, Tunisia, 26 July 1943
 Comiso Airfield, Sicily, 4 September 1943
 Operated from bases in India, 7 April–June 1944

 Ciampino Airport, Italy, 10 July 1944
 Operated from Istres/Le Tubé Airfield (Y-17), France, 7 September–11 October 1944
 Rosignano Airfield, Italy, 10 January–23 May 1945
 Operated from Brindisi Airfield, Italy, 29 March–13 May 1945
 Waller Field, Trinidad, 4 June–31 July 1945
 Langley Field (later Langley Air Fore Base), Virginia 19 May 1947 – 10 September 1948
 Donaldson Air Force Base, South Carolina, 14 July 1952 – 21 July 1954
 Dyess Air Force Base, Texas, 8 February 1961
 Elmendorf Air Force Base, Alaska, 15 June 1964 – present

Aircraft

 Douglas C-47 Skytrain (1941–1945)
 Fairchild C-82 Packet (1952–1953)
 Fairchild C-119 Flying Boxcar (1953–1954)
 Lockheed C-130 Hercules (1961–2007)

 Douglas C-124 Globemaster II (1970–1971)
 Beechcraft C-12 Huron (1992–present)
 Boeing C-17 Globemaster III (2007–present)

Awards and campaigns
 Campaigns. World War II: Algeria-French Morocco; Tunisia; Sicily; Naples-Foggia; Rome-Arno; Southern France; North Apennines; Po Valley, India-Burma. Vietnam: Vietnam Air Offensive; Vietnam Air Offensive, Phase II. 
 Decorations. Distinguished Unit Citation: CBI Theater, 7 Apr-15 June 1944. Air Force Outstanding Unit Award with Combat "V" Device: 2 May 1967 – 1 January 1968. Air Force Outstanding Unit Awards: 1 July 1962 – 15 June 1964; 16 June 1964 – 31 May 1966; 8 July 1966 – 1 May 1967; 2 Jan-31 December 1968; 1 Jan-31 December 1969; 1 Jan-31 December 1970; 1 Jan-31 December 1971; 1 Jan-31 December 1972; 1 Jan-31 December 1974; 1 Jan-30 March 1975; 1 Jan-31 December 1979; 1 June 1986 – 31 May 1987; 1 June 1987 – 31 May 1989; 1 January 1994 – 31 December 1995; 1 January 1996 – 30 September 1998; 1 January 2000 – 31 December 2001; 1 January 2002 – 30 September 2003; 1 October 2003 – 30 September 2005. Republic of Vietnam Gallantry Cross with Palm: 1 September 1966 – 1 January 1968.

References

Notes
 Explanatory notes

 Citations

Bibliography

External links
517th Airlift Squadron Fact Sheet
 

0517
Military units and formations in Alaska